Weller at the BBC is a 2008 live compilation of Paul Weller's BBC performances recorded between 1990 and 2008. Four physical versions were released: a 4-disc CD box set, a 2-disc CD set of highlights, 3-disc LP set and a DVD plus a 13-disc download-only version with 188 tracks from iTunes.

Track listing

4-disc box set
Disc 1:
Fly on the Wall (Johnnie Walker – Live 5.9.92)
Pink on White Walls
Amongst Butterflies
Wild Wood (Saturday Sequence – Johnnie Walker – 2.10.93)
Hung Up
Out of the Sinking (band version)
Clues
Whirlpools' End (Lunchtime Show – Emma Freud – 26.10.94)
Out of the Sinking (acoustic version) (Lunchtime Show – 1.11.1994)
Broken Stones (band version)
Time Passes
The Changingman
I Walk on Gilded Splinters (Evening Session – 8.5.95)
Broken Stones (acoustic version)
You Do Something To Me (Simon Mayo – 12.9.95)
Brushed
Peacock Suit
Up in Suzes' Room
Friday Street
Mermaids
The Poacher (Evening Session Live – 10.6.97)

Disc 2:
Driving Nowhere (Mark Goodier – 23.11.97)
Friday Street (acoustic version) (BBC Radio 4 Kaleidoscope – Live in the Studio 19.9. 97)
Science (BBC Radio 1 Jo Wiley – 1997)
Wishing on a Star
Thinking of You (BBC Radio 2 The Drivetime Show With Johnnie Walker – 1.9.04)
Corrina, Corrina
Early Morning Rain
Foot of the Mountain (Mark Lamarr For Jonathan Ross – 8.1.05)
To The Start of Forever
Out of the Sinking (BBC Radio 2 Janice Long – 4.3.05)
Paper Smile
Come On/Let's Go (The Drivetime Show With Stuart Maconie – 28.7.05)
Amongst Butterflies
Frightened
That's Entertainment (Mark Lamarr: Sold on Song – 11.2.06)
All I Wanna Do (Is Be With You)
Cold Moments
Push It Along
Pretty Flamingo (Mark Lamarr: God's Jukebox – 5.7.08)

Disc 3:
My Ever Changing Moods (Town and Country Club 05.12.1990)
A Man of Great Promise (Town and Country Club 05.12.1990)
Kosmos (Town and Country Club 05.12.1990)
Speak Like a Child (Town and Country Club 05.12.1990)
Just Like Yesterday (Town and Country Club 05.12.1990)
Work To Do (Town and Country Club 05.12.1990)
Pity Poor Alfie (Town and Country Club 05.12.1990)
What's Goin On (London Royal Albert Hall 13.10.1992)
Uh Huh Oh Yeh! (Always There To Fool You!) (London Royal Albert Hall 13.10.1992)
Hercules (London Royal Albert Hall 13.10.1992)
Bull-Rush / Magic Bus (London Royal Albert Hall 13.10.1992)
Above The Clouds (London Royal Albert Hall 13.10.1992)
Everything Has A Price To Pay (London Royal Albert Hall 13.10.1992)
Headstart For Happiness (London Royal Albert Hall 13.10.1992)
Into Tomorrow (London Royal Albert Hall 13.10.1992)
Porcelain Gods (Phoenix Festival 13.07.1995)
Stanley Road (Phoenix Festival 13.07.1995)
Can You Heal Us (Holy Man) (Phoenix Festival 13.07.1995)

Disc 4:
Shadow of the Sun (Phoenix Festival 13.07.1995)
I Walk on Gilded Splinters w/ Noel Gallagher (Phoenix Festival 13.07.1995)
Out of the Sinking (Finsbury Park 09.06.1996)
Hung Up (Finsbury Park 09.06.1996)
Sunflower (Finsbury Park 09.06.1996)
Broken Stones (Finsbury Park 09.06.1996)
Fly on the Wall (Finsbury Park 09.06.1996)
Tales From the Riverbank (Finsbury Park 09.06.1996)
Peacock Suit (London Victoria Park 08.08.1998)
Heavy Soul (London Victoria Park 08.08.1998)
Science (London Victoria Park 08.08.1998)
I Didn't Mean To Hurt You (BBC Radio Theatre 09.11.1998)
Brand New Start (BBC Radio Theatre 09.11.1998)
Wild Wood (BBC Radio Theatre 09.11.1998)
Friday Street (BBC Radio Theatre 09.11.1998)
The Changingman (BBC Radio Theatre 09.11.1998)

2-disc Highlights
Disc 1:
Fly on the Wall
Wild Wood
Hung Up
Clues
Out of the Sinking
Broken Stones
You Do Something To Me
Brushed
Peacock Suit
The Poacher
Driving Nowhere
Friday Street
Thinking of You
Corrina, Corrina
Early Morning Rain
To The Start of Forever
Come On/Let's Go
Amongst Butterflies
That's Entertainment
All I Wanna Do (Is Be With You)
Push It Along
Pretty Flamingo

Disc 2:
My Ever Changing Moods (Town and Country Club 05.12.1990)
Kosmos (Town and Country Club 05.12.1990)
Just Like Yesterday (Town and Country Club 05.12.1990)
What's Goin On (London Royal Albert Hall 13.10.1992)
Everything Has A Price To Pay (London Royal Albert Hall 13.10.1992)
Headstart For Happiness (London Royal Albert Hall 13.10.1992)
Into Tomorrow (London Royal Albert Hall 13.10.1992)
Can You Heal Us (Holy Man) (Phoenix Festival 13.07.1995)
Shadow of the Sun (Phoenix Festival 13.07.1995)
I Walk on Gilded Splinters w/ Noel Gallagher (Phoenix Festival 13.07.1995)
Sunflower (Finsbury Park 09.06.1996)
Tales From The Riverbank (Finsbury Park 09.06.1996)
Peacock Suit (London Victoria Park 08.08.1998)
Science (London Victoria Park 08.08.1998)
I Didn't Mean To Hurt You (BBC Radio Theatre 09.11.1998)
Brand New Start (BBC Radio Theatre 09.11.1998)
The Changingman (BBC Radio Theatre 09.11.1998)

DVD

13-Disc Digital Download Edition

Disc 2

Reason to Believe (Gary Crowley Greater London Radio 16 May 1995)	2:16
Black Sheep Boy (Gary Crowley Greater London Radio 16 May 1995)	2:12
Fly on the Wall (Gary Crowley Greater London Radio 16 May 1995)	3:30
Broken Stones (Simon Mayo – Recorded 31 August 1995 Transmitted 8/5/1995)	2:29
You Do Something to Me (Simon Mayo – Recorded 31 August 1995 Transmitted 8/5/1995)	3:23
Porcelain Gods (Gary Crowley Show 29 July 1996 – Greather London Radio)	5:07
Peacock Suit (Gary Crowley Show 29 July 1996 Greater London Radio)	3:27
All the Pictures on the Wall (Gary Crowley Show 29 July 1996 – Greather London Radio)	3:47
Foot of the Mountain (Gary Crowley Greater London Radio 29 July 1996)	4:52
Up in Suzes' Room (Gary Crowley Show 29 July 1996 – Greather London Radio)	4:26
The Circle (Gary Crowley Show 29 July 1996 – Greather London Radio)	2:31
Driving Nowhere (Gary Crowley Show 29 July 1996 – Greather London Radio)	2:58
I Shall Be Released (Gary Crowley Show 29 July 1996 – Greather London Radio)	3:02
As You Lean into the Light (Greater London Radio 24 April 1997)	2:45
Brushed (Evening Session – Live 10/6/1997)	3:46
Peacock Suit (Evening Session – Live 10/6/1997)	3:04
Up in Suzes' Room (Evening Session – Live 10/6/1997)	4:35
Friday Street (Evening Session – Live 10/6/1997)	2:30
Mermaids (Evening Session – Live 10/6/1997)	3:12
The Poacher (Evening Session – Live 10/6/1997)	3:15
Heavy Soul, Pt. 1 & 2 (Evening Session – Live 10/6/1997)	7:42

Disc 3

Driving Nowhere (Mark Goodier – Transmitted 23 November 1997)	2:49
Waiting on an Angel (Mark Goodier Transmitted 23.11.97)	3:58
Friday Street (Kaledoscope Live in the Studio 19 September 1997)	2:30
Science (Jo Whiley Recorded 1997)	3:34
Wishing on a Star (The Drivetime Show With Johnnie Walker Date 1/9/2004)	3:29
Thinking of You (The Drivetime Show With Johnnie Walker Date 1/9/2004)	3:10
Corrina, Corrina (Mark Lamarr For Jonathan Ross 8/1/2005)	2:26
Early Morning Rain (Mark Lamarr For Jonathan Ross 8/1/2005)	3:59
Foot of the Mountain (Mark Lamarr For Jonathan Ross 8/1/2005)	3:20
Early Morning Rain (Janice Long 4/3/2005)	3:49
To the Start of Forever (Janice Long 4/3/2005)	4:24
Out of the Sinking (Janice Long 4/3/2005)	3:07
Paper Smile (The Drivetime Show With Stuart Maconie)	3:01
Come On / Let's Go (The Drivetime Show With Stuart Maconie)	3:00
Roll Along Summer (Jonathan Ross 10/6/2006)	3:42
I Wanna Make It Alright (Jonathan Ross 10/6/2006)	3:35
All I Wanna Do (Is Be With You)	4:07
Cold Moments (Mark Lamarr – God's Jukebox 5/7/2008)	4:56
Push It Along (Mark Lamarr – God's Jukebox 5/7/2008)	2:48
Pretty Flamingo (Mark Lamarr – God's Jukebox 5/7/2008)	2:41

Disc 4 – London Town and Country Club 05.12.1990

My Ever Changing Moods 5:50
A Man of Great Promise 2:25
Round & Round 4:41
Kosmos 6:43
Homebreakers 5:49
The Strange Museum 3:29
The Whole Point II 2:43
Speak Like a Child 2:56
Just Like Yesterday 5:35
Precious 3:54
Headstart for Happiness 3:22
Work to Do 2:55
Pity Poor Alfie 3:22

Disc 5 – London Royal Albert Hall 13.10.1992 Disc 1

What's Goin On? 4:00
Uh Huh Oh Yeh! (Always There to Fool You!) 3:35
Man in the Corner Shop 3:22
(When You) Call Me 3:31
Hercules 4:05
Bull-Rush / Magic Bus 5:12
Round & Round 4:04
Above the Clouds 4:00
Arrival Time 8:27
Everything Has a Price to Pay 3:34

Disc 7 – Phoenix Festival 13.07.1995

The Changingman	3:59
Hung Up 2:44
Has My Fire Really Gone Out? 3:44
Whirlpools' End 6:04
Uh Huh Oh Yeh! 3:09
Out of the Sinking 3:43
I Didn't Mean to Hurt You 3:55
Porcelain Gods 6:40
Stanley Road 4:12
You Do Something to Me 3:33
Can You Heal Us (Holy Man) 4:05
Shadow of the Sun 8:42
Sunflower 3:58
Into Tomorrow 3:15
Broken Stones 3:07
Woodcutter's Son 5:41
The Swamp Song feat. Noel Gallagher 2:46
I Walk on Gilded Splinters feat. Noel Gallagher 3:58

Disc 8 – London Finsbury Park 09.06.1996

The Changingman 3:56
I Walk on Gilded Splinters 4:18
Out of the Sinking 3:32
Hung Up 2:41
Sunflower 4:02
Broken Stones 3:26
Fly on the Wall 3:19
Wild Wood 3:33
Tales from the Riverbank 3:22
Foot of the Mountain 5:04
You Do Something to Me 3:32
Can You Heal Us (Holy Man) 4:08
Woodcutter's Son 5:30
Whirlpools' End 7:48

Disc 9 – Cardiff 11.05.1997

I Walk on Gilded Splinters 4:19
Peacock Suit 2:55
Porcelain Gods 7:00
Heavy Soul 7:10
Broken Stones 3:21
Friday Street 2:26
The Changingman 3:30
Woodcutter's Son 6:06
Mermaids 3:06
Sunflower 4:01
Into Tomorrow 3:22

Disc 10 – London Victoria Park 08.08.1998Tracks 1, 2, 3, 4, 5, 6, 8, 10, 11, 12, 13, 14 and 17 were previously released as part of Modern Greats the best of Paul Weller in 1998 on the bonus Live CD Live Classics. Also broadcast as a highlights set on Lamacq Live.

Into Tomorrow 3:30
Peacock Suit 2:58
Friday Street 2:22
Mermaids 3:10
Sunflower 4:00
Out of the Sinking 3:37
Science 3:54
Heavy Soul 8:09
As You Lean into the Light 2:59
Wild Wood 3:43
Up in Suzes' Room 4:42
Can You Heal Us (Holy Man)
The Changingman 3:34
Porcelain Gods 5:26
Woodcutter's Son 5:23
I Walk on Gilded Splinters w/ Noel Gallagher 4:21
Broken Stones 3:44

References

BBC Radio recordings
2008 live albums
2008 compilation albums
2008 video albums
Live video albums
Paul Weller live albums
Paul Weller video albums
Universal Records compilation albums
Universal Records live albums
Universal Records video albums